Beville is a surname. Notable people with the surname include:

Monte Beville (1875–1955), American baseball player
Ben Beville (1877–1937), American baseball player
Stephen Beville, English composer and pianist
Thomas Beville (disambiguation), multiple people